Pappy is another name for father. 

Pappy is a nickname of:

People
 Pappy Boyington (1912–1988), Flying Tiger and American fighter ace in World War II
 Fred Coe (1914–1979), American television producer and director
 Pappy Daily (1902–1987), American country music record producer and entrepreneur
 Paul Gunn (1899–1957), American World War II naval aviator
 John C. Herbst (1909–1946), American flying ace in World War II
 Duane S. Larson (1916–2005), American World War II fighter pilot
 Howard Mason (born 1959), American drug trafficker
 W. Lee O'Daniel (1890–1969), Texas governor and senator
 Bert Papworth (1890s–1980), British trade unionist
 Paul Rowe (Canadian football) (1917–1990), professional football player 
 Pappy Waldorf (1902–1981), American football player and coach
 Grover Washabaugh (c. 1893–1973), American college and high school football and basketball coach
 Pappy Wood (1888–1978), Canadian curler

Fictional characters
 Poopdeck Pappy, father of the comic strip character Popeye
 Pappy Yokum, father of Li'l Abner

See also
 Pappy's, a British three-man comedy act
 Pappy's Smokehouse, a barbecue restaurant in St. Louis
 Dad (nickname)
 Daddy (nickname)
 Papa (nickname)
 Pop (nickname)
 Pops (nickname)

Lists of people by nickname